Mukim Tanjong Maya is a mukim in Tutong District, Brunei. The population was 4,062 in 2016.

Geography 
The mukim is named after Kampong Tanjong Maya, one of the villages it encompasses.

The mukim is located in the central north of Tutong District, bordering Mukim Pekan Tutong to the north, Mukim Kiudang to the east, Mukim Lamunin to the south-east, Mukim Ukong to the south-west and Mukim Telisai to the west.

Demographics 
As of 2016 census, the population was 4,062 with  males and  females. The mukim had 674 households occupying 667 dwellings. The entire population lived in rural areas.

Villages 
As of 2016, the mukim comprised the following census villages:

References 

Tanjong Maya
Tutong District